The coat of arms of Barbados was adopted on 14 February 1966, by a royal warrant of Queen Elizabeth II. The coat of arms of Barbados was presented by the Queen to the then President of the Senate of Barbados, Sir Grey Massiah. Like other former British possessions in the Caribbean, the coat of arms has a helmet with a national symbol on top, and a shield beneath that is supported by two animals.

The arms were designed by Neville Connell, for many years curator of the Barbados Museum, with artistic assistance by Hilda Ince.

Official description

Barbadian law puts for the blazon of the coat of arms as follows:

Arms: Or a bearded Fig Tree eradicated in chief two Red Pride of Barbados Flowers proper.

Crest: On a Wreath Or and Gules A dexter Cubit Arm of a Barbadian erect proper the hand grasping two Sugar Canes in saltire proper.

Supporters: On the sinister (left) side a Dolphinfish and on the dexter (right) side a Pelican proper.

Motto: “ Pride and Industry. ”

See also 

Flag of Barbados
National symbols of Barbados

References

Notes 

CHAPTER 300A NATIONAL EMBLEMS AND NATIONAL ANTHEM OF BARBADOS (REGULATION)

External links 

  Coat of arms of Barbados In The World All Countries Coat of arms
 Coat of Arms, Gov.bb
 The Barbados Parliament: Independence (Contains information on the Coat of Arms)

National symbols of Barbados
Barbados
Barbados
Barbados
Barbados
Barbados
Barbados
Barbados